Melones  may refer to:

 Melones, California, U.S., a former settlement, now submerged
 New Melones Lake
 New Melones Dam
 Carson Hill, California, U.S., formerly known as Melones
 Melones Dam (Cuba)
 Melones Formation, a geologic formation in Puerto Rico

See also
 Melon (disambiguation)